Williamsport Township is a township in Shawnee County, Kansas, in the United States.

History
Williamsport Township was organized by settlers from Williamsport, Pennsylvania.

References

Townships in Shawnee County, Kansas
Townships in Kansas